Umesh Waghmare is an Indian physicist, and presently a Professor in the Theoretical Sciences Unit at Jawaharlal Nehru Centre for Advanced Scientific Research. 

Research in his Materials Theory Group is fundamentally based on computer simulations of electronic motion governed by quantum physics and resulting electron-mediated inter-atomic interactions which are responsible for multi-scale behaviour of materials. Deriving material-specific information on chemical bonding and microscopic couplings that are essential to the specific properties of a material, they develop fundamental understanding of a material in terms of its atomic structure and electronic structure. The goal of their theoretical analysis is to derive material-specific properties on the macroscopic and intermediate length and time scales starting from a first principles description of chemistry and atomic structure.

They complement experimental work by accessing the microscopic information that may be hard to access in a laboratory. Their work leads to design of new materials or modification of existing materials to yield desired properties, or narrowing down the choices of new materials for design by experiment. Recently, they have shown how techniques of machine learning can be constrained by dimensional analysis and physical laws to develop simple and predictive models that benefit from both the data and existing knowledge.

Career 
 2022 - present, President, Indian Academy of Sciences, Bangalore
 2000 - present, Faculty Member, JNCASR, Bangalore
 1996 - 2000, Harvard University, Physics
 1996 — Ph. D., Yale University, in Applied Physics
 1994 — M. S., Yale University, in Applied Physics
 1994 — M. Phil., Yale University, in Applied Physics
 1990 — B. Tech., Indian Institute of Technology, Bombay, in Engineering Physics

Awards 
 2015 - Infosys Prize in Engineering and Computer Science
 2010 - Waghmare was awarded the Shanti Swarup Bhatnagar Prize for Science and Technology for contributions to the physical sciences.

References 

Year of birth missing (living people)
Living people
Indian condensed matter physicists
Recipients of the Shanti Swarup Bhatnagar Award in Physical Science
IIT Bombay alumni
Yale University alumni